George Edward Jeffcoat (December 24, 1913 – October 13, 1978), was a professional baseball pitcher who played in the major leagues for the Brooklyn Dodgers and Boston Braves from 1936 to 1943.

Jeffcoat was the last player in the Dodgers franchise to wear jersey number 42 before Jackie Robinson. He wore the jersey during only the 1939 season.

Jeffcoat's younger brother, Hal Jeffcoat, also played in the major leagues as an outfielder and pitcher, and his nephew Harold George Jeffcoat pitched in the minor leagues.

Born in New Brookland, South Carolina, Jeffcoat died of a self-inflicted gunshot wound in Leesville, South Carolina in 1978.

References

External links

1913 births
1978 deaths
Major League Baseball pitchers
Baseball players from South Carolina
Brooklyn Dodgers players
Boston Braves players
Leaksville-Draper-Spray Triplets players
Kansas City Blues (baseball) players
Nashville Vols players
Indianapolis Indians players
Tulsa Oilers (baseball) players
Shreveport Sports players
People from West Columbia, South Carolina
Suicides by firearm in South Carolina